Areva is a genus of moths in the subfamily Arctiinae.

Species
 Areva albogrisea Rothschild, 1912
 Areva laticilia Walker, 1854
 Areva subfulgens Schaus, 1896
 Areva trigemmis Hübner, 1827

References

Natural History Museum Lepidoptera generic names catalog

Lithosiini
Moth genera